Antonio Leone (born 16 January 1948) is an Italian lawyer and politician. He served as Vice President of the Chamber of Deputies during Legislature XVI, from 2008 to 2013. He was a member of the High Council of the Judiciary from 2014 to 2018. Since 2018 he has been President of the Presidential Council of Tax Justice.

Leone was first elected to the Chamber of Deputies for the constituency of Apulia during Legislature XIII, in 1996. He was a member of Forza Italia until 2008, of The People of Freedom from 2008 to 2013, and of New Centre-Right from 2013 to 2014.

References

1948 births
Living people
Forza Italia politicians
The People of Freedom politicians
New Centre-Right politicians
Vice presidents of the Chamber of Deputies (Italy)
Deputies of Legislature XIII of Italy
Deputies of Legislature XIV of Italy
Deputies of Legislature XV of Italy
Deputies of Legislature XVI of Italy
Deputies of Legislature XVII of Italy